Duncan Lambie (20 April 1952 – December 2015) was a Scottish footballer, who played for Dundee, St Johnstone, SpVgg. Fürth, and Hibernian.

References

External links 
Duncan Lambie, www.ihibs.co.uk

1952 births
2015 deaths
People from Whitburn, West Lothian
Footballers from West Lothian
Association football wingers
Scottish footballers
Armadale Thistle F.C. players
Dundee F.C. players
St Johnstone F.C. players
SpVgg Greuther Fürth players
Hibernian F.C. players
Scottish Football League players
Scottish expatriate footballers
Expatriate footballers in West Germany
Date of death unknown
Scottish expatriate sportspeople in West Germany